Mauricio Afonso  is a former Indian footballer who played as a midfielder for India in the 1984 Asian Cup. He also played for CRC Chinchinim, Salcete, Salgaocar and Dempo. He has most recently managed Dempo in the Goa Professional League.

He has also represented India in 1983 Presidents Cup in Bangladesh and the 1983 Pre-Olympic qualifiers in New Delhi, Singapore, Kuala Lumpur and Riyadh.

Honours

India
 South Asian Games Bronze medal: 1989

Goa
 Santosh Trophy: 1983–84

See also
 List of India national football team captains

References

External links
Stats
Profile on Goa Veterans

Living people
People from South Goa district
Indian footballers
India international footballers
1984 AFC Asian Cup players
1961 births
Footballers at the 1986 Asian Games
Footballers from Goa
Association football midfielders
Asian Games competitors for India
South Asian Games medalists in football
South Asian Games bronze medalists for India